Buckner House and variations may refer to:

in the United States (by state then city)
Buckner House (Greensburg, Kentucky), listed on the National Register of Historic Places in Green County, Kentucky
Walker Buckner House, Paris, Kentucky, listed on the National Register of Historic Places in Bourbon County, Kentucky
Buckner House (Marshall, Missouri), listed on the National Register of Historic Places in Saline County, Missouri
Dr. Philip Buckner House and Barn, Georgetown, Ohio, listed on the National Register of Historic Places in Brown County, Ohio
Buckner Cabin, Stehekin, Washington, listed on the NRHP in Washington
Buckner Homestead Historic District, Stehekin, Washington, listed on the NRHP in Washington